In Greek mythology, Alcinous (Ancient Greek: Ἀλκίνους or Ἀλκίνοος Alkínoös means "mighty mind") was a son of Nausithous and brother of Rhexenor. After the latter's death, he married his brother's daughter Arete who bore him Nausicaa, Halius, Clytoneus and Laodamas. In some accounts, Alcinous' father was Phaeax, son of Poseidon and Corcyra, and brother of Locrus.

Mythology

Argonautica 
In the myth of Jason and the Argonauts, Alcinous is represented as living with his wife Arete on Drépané island.  The Argonauts, on their return from Colchis, came to his island, and were hospitably received.  When the Colchians, in their pursuit of the Argonauts, likewise arrived in Drépané, and demanded that Jason's lover Medea should be delivered up to them, Alcinous declared that if she was still a virgin she should be restored to them, but if she was already the wife of Jason, he would protect her and her husband against the Colchians.  The Colchians were obliged, by the contrivance of Arete, to depart without their princess, and the Argonauts continued their voyage homeward, after they had received expensive presents from Alcinous. He was also the King of the Phaeacians.

Odyssey 

According to Homer, Alcinous is the happy ruler of the Phaiacians in the island of Scheria, who has by Arete five sons and one daughter, Nausicaa. The description of his palace and his dominions, the mode in which Odysseus is received, the entertainments given to him, and the stories he related to the king about his own wanderings, occupy a considerable portion of Homer's Odyssey (from book vi. to xiii.), and form one of its most charming parts. Alcinous has a squire, Pontonous, who serves wine during this feast.

Other accounts 
In Conon's Narrations, when Phaiax who reigned on the island of Corcyra died, Alkinous and his brother Lokros, after quarreling agreed upon on the basis that Alcinous would be the king of the Phaeacians and Locrus would take the heirlooms and part of the ethnos to make a colony. The latter sailed to Italy where he married the Laurine, daughter of King Latinus of the Italians and for this reason, the Phaiakians claim the Lokrians in Italy as relatives.

See also 
 11428 Alcinoös, Jovian asteroid named after Alcinous
 Garden of Alcinous

Notes

References 

 Apollonius Rhodius, Argonautica translated by Robert Cooper Seaton (1853–1915), R. C. Loeb Classical Library Volume 001. London: William Heinemann Ltd, 1912. Online version at the Topos Text Project.
 Apollonius Rhodius, Argonautica. George W. Mooney. London: Longmans, Green. 1912. Greek text available at the Perseus Digital Library.
 Conon, Fifty Narrations, surviving as one-paragraph summaries in the Bibliotheca (Library) of Photius, Patriarch of Constantinople translated from the Greek by Brady Kiesling. Online version at the Topos Text Project.
 Gaius Julius Hyginus, Fabulae from The Myths of Hyginus translated and edited by Mary Grant. University of Kansas Publications in Humanistic Studies. Online version at the Topos Text Project.
 Homer, The Odyssey with an English Translation by A.T. Murray, PH.D. in two volumes. Cambridge, MA: Harvard University Press; London: William Heinemann, Ltd. 1919. Online version at the Perseus Digital Library. Greek text available from the same website.
 Pseudo-Apollodorus, The Library with an English Translation by Sir James George Frazer, F.B.A., F.R.S. in 2 Volumes, Cambridge, MA: Harvard University Press; London: William Heinemann Ltd. 1921. Online version at the Perseus Digital Library. Greek text available from the same website.
 The Orphic Argonautica, translated by Jason Colavito. 2011. Online version at the Topos Text Project.

External links 

 JC Loudon (1835) on the Garden of Alcinous

Kings in Greek mythology
Characters in the Argonautica
Characters in the Odyssey
Phaeacians in Greek mythology